Skarżysko Kościelne  is a village in Skarżysko County, Świętokrzyskie Voivodeship, Poland. It is the seat of the administrative district of Gmina Skarżysko Kościelne. It should not be confused with the nearby town of Skarżysko-Kamienna.

One of the village's attractions is the Holy Trinity Church, erected between 1637 and 1643 (pictured).

Villages in Skarżysko County
Radom Governorate
Kielce Voivodeship (1919–1939)